"After All" is a 1989 Billboard Hot 100 hit song performed as a duet by American singers Cher and Peter Cetera, released on February 21, 1989, by Geffen Records. It was used as the love theme for the movie Chances Are and was nominated for Best Original Song at the Academy Awards 1989. The song was also the first North American single release from Cher's nineteenth album Heart of Stone. The song appears on Peter Cetera's 1997 album You're The Inspiration – A Collection and his 2017 album, The Very Best of Peter Cetera.

Chart information
The single peaked at number six in the United States and Canada.  It also managed to enter some European charts, including Ireland, where it peaked at 24, and the United Kingdom, where it reached 84.

"After All" also became Cher's first solo number one hit on the Adult Contemporary chart in the United States. Her earlier number one was in 1971 when Sonny & Cher's "All I Ever Need Is You" spent five weeks at the top. In a 2014 article in Billboard, writer Keith Caulfield listed "After All" as Cher's ninth biggest chart hit. The song was ranked number 79 on US Billboard Year-end Hot 100 singles of 1989. The song found strong success stateside, but no video was ever made to further promote it. It was certified Gold by the RIAA for the sales of 500,000 copies. , Billboard reported the digital sales of "After All" to be 226,000 in the US.

Live performances
At the 62nd Academy Awards in 1990, the song was performed by James Ingram and Melissa Manchester.

Cher and Cetera have never performed the song together live. Cher performed a solo version of the song during her Heart of Stone and Love Hurts tours. She then performed it with her keyboardist/musical director, Paul Mirkovich, for her Believe and Farewell tours. She also performed it in her residencies Cher at the Colosseum and Classic Cher, as well as during her Here We Go Again Tour. The latter performances would accompany a video montage of Cher in film, which would start before the song begins.

Since the early 2000s, Peter Cetera has been performing "After All" during his live performances as a duet with female backing vocalists including Kim Keyes, Jamelle Fraley, and Tania Hancheroff.

Track listing
US and European 7" and cassette single
"After All" – 4:06
"Dangerous Times" – 3:00

European 12" and CD single
"After All"
"Dangerous Times"
"I Found Someone"
"Main Man"

Personnel 
 Cher – lead vocals 
 Peter Cetera – lead vocals 
 Robbie Buchanan – keyboards 
 Jon Gilutin – keyboards 
 Michael Landau – guitars 
 Waddy Wachtel – guitars 
 Leland Sklar – bass 
 Carlos Vega – drums
 Michael Fisher – percussion

Cover versions
Filipino singers Martin Nievera and Vina Morales covered this song and their version was used as the theme song for the local soap opera series A Beautiful Affair.

Official versions
Main Version (4:03)
Edit (3:39)

Charts and certifications

Weekly charts

Year-end charts

Certifications and sales

References

External links
Official Cher site

Thomas Anders site

1989 songs
1989 singles
Cher songs
Peter Cetera songs
Male–female vocal duets
Pop ballads
Songs written by Tom Snow
Songs written by Dean Pitchford
Love themes
1980s ballads
Geffen Records singles
Song recordings produced by Peter Asher